Pascasio Gilberto Sola (8 November 1928 – 27 November 2002) was an Argentine footballer who played as a midfielder, making six appearances for the Argentina national team between 1955 and 1957. He was also part of Argentina's squad for the 1955 South American Championship. In his senior club career, he represented Club Atlético River Plate between 1953 and 1958.

References

External links 
 

1928 births
2002 deaths
Argentine footballers
Argentina international footballers
Association football midfielders
Talleres de Remedios de Escalada footballers
Club Atlético River Plate footballers
Club Atlético Huracán footballers
Argentine Primera División players
Footballers from Buenos Aires